This article is a detailed listing of releases by the hip hop group De La Soul. They have one platinum and two gold records, and one Grammy Award. The group have sold over 5 million albums in the US.

Albums

Studio albums

Live albums

Compilation albums

Mixtapes

Extended plays
 Clear Lake Audiotorium (1994)
 Days Off (2004)
 For Your Pain & Suffering (2016)

Singles

As lead artist

As featured performer

Music videos

Guest appearances
 1996: "I Can't Call It" (from High School High (soundtrack))
 1997: "Chanel No. Fever" (from Men in Black: The Album)
 1997: "Gettin' Down at the Amphitheater" (from Common album One Day It'll All Make Sense)
 1997: "B-Side to Hollywood" (Trugoy from Camp Lo album Uptown Saturday Night)
 1998: "Intro" (from the compilation Lyricist Lounge, Volume One)
 1998: "360° (Oh Yeah)" (Propellerheads album Decksandrumsandrockandroll)
 1999: "The Projects (P Jays)" (Trugoy the Dove featuring Del the Funky Homosapien) (from Handsome Boy Modeling School album So... How's Your Girl? )
 1999: "More Than You Know" (from Prince Paul album A Prince Among Thieves)
 1999: "Star Track" (from Alliance Ethnik album Fat Come Back)
 2000: "Cali to New York" (from The Black Eyed Peas album Bridging the Gap)
 2000: "So Good" (Produced by De La Soul) (De La Soul featuring Camp Lo from Various Artists album Hip Hop 101 [Tommy Boy Black Label 2000])
 2000: "Words & Verbs" (Produced by Dave Banner, Kovas & Maseo) (Maseo featuring Kovas from Various Artists album Hip Hop 101 [Tommy Boy Black Label 2000])
 2000: "Soul Rebels" (from Reflection Eternal album Train of Thought)
 2001: "Say "I Gotta Believe!"" (from the PaRappa the Rapper 2 soundtrack featuring De La Soul and Double)
 2001: "Turn It Out" (featuring Elizabeth "Yummy" Bingham) (from Osmosis Jones (soundtrack))
 2004: "If It Wasn't For You" (De La Soul featuring Starchild Excalibur) (from Handsome Boy Modeling School album White People )
 2005: "Feel Good Inc." (from the Gorillaz album Demon Days)
 2006: "Smile a Lil Bit" (Posdnuos featuring Oh No from Oh No Album Exodus into Unheard Rhythms)
 2006: "So Cool" (from the DJ Muro soundtrack to Tokyo Tribe 2 feat. De La Soul and Lunch Time Speax)
 2007: "Universal" (feat. Posdnous From LA Symphony - Unleashed)
 2007: "Stay Away" (from the album Rob-O - Rhyme Pro)
 2007: "Let Me Hear U Clap" (DJ Jazzy Jeff album The Return of the Magnificent)
 2008: "Oh Really" (Posdnuos feat. Slug From Jake One Album White Van Music)
 2009: "Daylight (Troublemaker Remix)" (from the FIFA 10 soundtrack and Daylight single by Matt and Kim)
 2009: "Rewind DJ" by Eslam Jawaad from his debut album The Mammoth Tusk
 2010: "Superfast Jellyfish" (from the Gorillaz album Plastic Beach)
 2010: "The Return of DST" (exclusive internet track)
 2013: "Church Road" (Wrekonize album The War Within)
 2014: "Seal Me With a Kiss" (from the Jessie J album Sweet Talker)
 2014: "Navajo Rugs" (from the Stalley album Ohio)
 2017: "Momentz" (from the Gorillaz album Humanz)
 2017: "Leap Of Faith" (from Mr Jukes album God First)
 2018: "All Around The World" (from The Black Eyed Peas album Masters of the Sun Vol. 1)
 2023: "Crocadillaz" (from the Gorillaz album Cracker Island)

Notes

References

Hip hop discographies
Discographies of American artists
 Discography